Danthonia holm-nielsenii is a species of grass in the family Poaceae. It is found only in Ecuador.

References

holm-nielsenii
Bunchgrasses of South America
Endemic flora of Ecuador
Vulnerable flora of South America
Taxonomy articles created by Polbot